The 1984 Missouri Tigers football team was an American football team that represented the University of Missouri in the Big Eight Conference (Big 8) during the 1984 NCAA Division I-A football season. The team compiled a 3–7–1 record (2–4–1 against Big 8 opponents), finished in a tie for fifth place in the Big 8, and outscored its opponents by a combined total of 310 to 301. Warren Powers was the head coach for the seventh of seven seasons. The team played its home games at Faurot Field in Columbia, Missouri.

The team's statistical leaders included Jon Redd with 668 rushing yards, Marlon Adler with 1,128 passing yards, and George Shorthose with 601 receiving yards.

Schedule

References

Missouri
Missouri Tigers football seasons
Missouri Tigers football